Conasprella mindana is a species of sea snail, a marine gastropod mollusk in the family Conidae, the cone snails and their allies.

Like all species within the genus Conasprella, these snails are predatory and venomous. They are capable of "stinging" humans, therefore live ones should be handled carefully or not at all.

Subspecies
 Conasprella mindanus bermudensis Clench, W.J., 1962
 Conasprella mindana mindana (Hwass in Bruguière, 1792)

Distribution
Locus typicus: (of C. mindanus agassizii) "Off Santa Cruz (=St. Croix, Virgin Islands) in 115 fathoms.
Specimens of the type material conspecific with C. agassizi 
were also collected off Barbados, in 76 fathoms."

This marine species occurs in the Caribbean Sea off Costa Rica, Guadeloupe and Curacao; in the Atlantic Ocean off Eastern Brazil, Barbados and Bermuda

Description 
The maximum recorded shell length is 50 mm.

Habitat 
Minimum recorded depth is 0 m. Maximum recorded depth is 210 m.

References

Conidae offshore de Guadeloupe : Description du matériel dragué lors de l’expédition KARUBENTHOS 2 contenant de nouvelles espèces. Xenophora Taxonomy 24: 3-31
  Puillandre N., Duda T.F., Meyer C., Olivera B.M. & Bouchet P. (2015). One, four or 100 genera? A new classification of the cone snails. Journal of Molluscan Studies. 81: 1–23

Gallery
Below are several color forms and one subspecies:

External links
 The Conus Biodiversity website
 Cone Shells – Knights of the Sea
 
 Specimen at MNHN, Paris

mindana
Gastropods described in 1792